A Nightmare To Remember is annual professional wrestling memorial event produced by the LN Promotions promotion with shows in 2011 and 2012, in memory of "The Nightmare" Ted Allen, a popular masked wrestler during the 1980s and an icon on the Georgia independent circuit, who died from a heart attack at his home in Cartersville, Georgia on August 19, 2010.

The events 
The proceeds from the event were donated to Allen's mother, Karen Allen, and the Gulf Coast Wrestlers Reunion's "Ted Allen Sunshine Fund". The inaugural show raised over $56,000. Additional concessions sales went towards Bay Springs Middle School in Villa Rica, Georgia.

In addition to paying tribute to Allen's career and contributions to pro wrestling, the event also served as a reunion show for wrestlers of the Southern United States, especially for former stars of the Georgia and Gulf Coast wrestling territories,  with wrestlers coming from as far away as Alabama, the Carolinas, Mississippi, Tennessee, and Texas to participate in the event. The original memorial show featured "Cowboy" Bob Kelly, Joyce Grable, Doug Somers, Brad Armstrong, Keith Steinborn, Charlie Smith, Curtis Smith, Sgt. Buddy Lee Parker, and Gene Lavelle. The special guests were officially introduced by Dave Wills, co-host of "The Dave & Danger Show", and who gained infamy on the internet as the "crying wrestling fan", serving as the official ring announcer. Also in attendance were former World Championship Wrestling commentators Scott Hudson and Steven Prazak, Peachstate Wrestling Alliance promoter Shane Noles, Georgia Championship Wrestling promoter Grady Odom, Platinum Championship Wrestling promoter Stephen Platinum, co-host of Peach State Pandemonium radio show Mike Norris (with Bobby Simmons and Jerry Oates), and wrestlers Fred Avery, Mike Golden, Hacksaw Higgins, Bulldog Raines, and "Dirty White Boy" Jimmy Powell. The main event was a Villa Rica Street Fight, billed as a "SCW Classic Match-Up", between the Original Bad Company (Steve Lawler & John Michaels) and Joel Deaton & Mr. Atlanta, which Lawler and Michaels won. Allen's old tag team partner, The Nightmare II of The Masked Nightmares, came out of retirement to be in Bad Company's corner. In the semi-main event, Kyle Matthews defeated Brad Armstrong. A 20-man "Nightmare" battle royal, won by George South, was also featured on the card.

The second show had Bill Dundee, Robert Gibson, Thunderbolt Patterson, Nick Busick, Randy Rose, Jerry Stubbs, Mac McMurray, Scotty Riggs, Jim Bryant, Levi Banks, Greg Evans, Jack Lord, Ron East, Gene Bennett, Miss Fifi, Burger Powell, Ranger Ross, and stand-up comedian James Gregory. The main event saw Kyle Matthews pin Jimmy Rave while Frankie Valentine defeated Chip Day, Epic Grant Mitchell, Joey Kidman, Lamar Philips, Josh Storm, and Stupid (with Tweety) in a 7-way elimination match. Hillbilly Festus won the 20-man "Nightmare" battle royal by eliminating The Russian Assassin (Ken Timbs, Jr.); outside the ring were special guest referees Ron West, Charlie Smith, Scrappy McGowan, and Bobby Simmons who refereed for Georgia Championship Wrestling during the 1970s and 80s.

The event was covered by WXIA in Atlanta. Terry Lawler, credited as "the driving force behind the event", was voted by his peers to receive the Ted Allen Mentorship Award (2011) from the GeorgiaWrestlingHistory.com website. In a live report of the final "Nightmare To Remember", Larry Goodman of GWH.com praised the event calling it "a sweet show, befitting the man it honored" with the event "filled with laughter and warm feelings, both in the arena and in the locker room".

Show results

A Nightmare To Remember
February 12, 2011 in Villa Rica, Georgia (Bay Springs Middle School)

A Nightmare To Remember II
February 11, 2012 in Villa Rica, Georgia (Bay Springs Middle School)

See also
List of professional wrestling memorial shows

References

External links
 LN Promotions.com
 Nightmare Ted Allen Tribute
 
 

2011 in professional wrestling
2012 in professional wrestling
Professional wrestling in Georgia (U.S. state)
Professional wrestling memorial shows
Events in Georgia (U.S. state)
2011 in Georgia (U.S. state)
2012 in Georgia (U.S. state)
February 2011 events in the United States
February 2012 events in the United States